Hauts de Bienne is a commune in the Jura department of eastern France. The municipality was established on 1 January 2016 by merger of the former communes of Morez, Lézat and La Mouille. The commune was named after the river Bienne, that passes through it.

Population

See also 
Communes of the Jura department

References 

Communes of Jura (department)
Populated places established in 2016